Paloma Bloyd Dubra (born March 6, 1988 in Chicago, Illinois) is a Spanish and American actress.

She is best known for playing the lead role in the romantic comedy “Perdona si te llamo Amor” based on the best selling novel written by Federico Moccia. In 2017, Bloyd joined the main cast of Spain’s longest running prime time TV show Cuéntame cómo pasó

Filmography

Film

Television

Theater
Adulterios (2008–2010) as Juliet, written by Woody Allen, directed by Verónica Forqué

Short films
 I Feel Lost (2012), directed by Juan Manuel Aragón.
 La Primera Noche (2012), directed by Eduardo Moyano.
Atracones (2010), directed by Bernabé Rico
No existe el adiós (2010), directed by Pablo Bullejos
Marisa (2009), directed by Nacho Vigalondo
Mythosis (2009), directed by Álvaro Díaz-Palacios

References

External links

1988 births
Living people
Spanish film actresses
Spanish television actresses
Spanish female models
American emigrants to Spain
American people of Asturian descent
American expatriates in Spain
Spanish stage actresses